Beech Hill is a historic former summer estate off New Harrisville Road in Dublin, New Hampshire.  The centerpiece of the estate, and its only major surviving element, is a large Georgian Revival mansion with hip roof and wide projecting eaves, which has views of the surrounding area.  The mansion was listed on the National Register of Historic Places in 1983.  It remains in private hands, but most of the surrounding estate is now local conservation land, with public hiking trails.

Description and history
Beech Hill is located on a hilltop just north of the town center of Dublin, on the west side of New Harrisville Road.  Sited prominently near the crest of the hill is the main house, a sprawling two-story structure whose main section is covered by a hip roof.  Its exterior trim includes corner pilasters and a dentillated cornice. The main block is extended by wings, including a more modern one that extends to one side of the swimming pool sited just east of the building.  The building is presently vacant and in deteriorated condition.

The house was designed by Charles A. Platt for his sister and brother-in-law, and built in 1902–3.  From 1949 until 2001 the property was used for a variety of medical and substance abuse treatment purposes.  The entire estate was acquired by a local conservation land trust in 2007, which sold the house into private hands and built walking trails on the rest of the estate.

See also
National Register of Historic Places listings in Cheshire County, New Hampshire

References

Houses on the National Register of Historic Places in New Hampshire
Houses completed in 1902
Houses in Dublin, New Hampshire
National Register of Historic Places in Dublin, New Hampshire